Hanna Chan (Chinese: 陳漢娜; born 24 September 1993), is a Hong Kong fashion model and actress.
She earned a nomination for the Best New Performer in Paradox at 37th Hong Kong Film Awards in 2018.

Filmography

Movie

Drama

TV Show

Music Video

Awards and nominations

References

External links 
 
 
 

1993 births
Living people
Hong Kong female models
Hong Kong actresses
21st-century Hong Kong actresses
Alumni of the Hong Kong Polytechnic University